The 2008 World Single Distance Speed Skating Championships were held between 6 March and 9 March 2008 in the M-Wave, Nagano, Nagano.

Schedule

Medal summary

Men's events

Note: TR = Track record

Women's events

Note: TR = Track record

Medal table

References
 Official results

2008 World Single Distance
2008 in speed skating
World Single Distance, 2008
Sports competitions in Nagano (city)
World Single Distance Speed Skating Championships